The 23rd Circuito di Pescara was a Formula One motor race, held on 15 August 1954, at the Pescara Circuit in Abruzzo, Italy. Luigi Musso in a Maserati 250F scored his first Formua 1 victory. B. Bira (Maserati 250F) and Harry Schell (Maserati A6GCM) were second and third, with Bira setting fastest lap. Stirling Moss in yet another 250F started from pole position but retired after 3 laps with a broken oil pipe.

Results

References 

Pescara Grand Prix
Auto races in Italy
Pescara Grand Prix